() is the Korean word for the set of eating utensils commonly used to eat Korean cuisine. The  set includes a pair of oval-shaped or rounded-rectangular metal (often stainless steel) chopsticks, and a long handled shallow spoon of the same material. One may use both at the same time, but this is a recent way to speed eating. It is not considered good etiquette to hold the spoon and the chopstick together in one hand especially while eating with elders. More often food is eaten with chopsticks alone.

Chopsticks may be put down on a table, but never put into food standing up, particularly rice, as this is considered to bring bad luck since it resembles food offerings at a grave to deceased ancestors. The spoon may be laid down on the rice bowl, or soup bowl, if it has not been used.  As food is eaten quickly, and portions are small, little time is spent in putting eating utensils down.

They are now sold as souvenirs.

See also
 Spoon and chopstick rest
Korean cuisine
Korean culture
Chopsticks

References

Food preparation utensils
Korean cuisine
Korean food preparation utensils
Eating utensils